Cornish is a town in Sullivan County, New Hampshire, United States. The population was 1,616 at the 2020 census. Cornish has four covered bridges. Each August, it is home to the Cornish Fair.

History

The town was granted in 1763 and contained an area once known as "Mast Camp", because it was the shipping point for the tall masts floated down the river by English settlers. It was incorporated in 1765 by colonial governor Benning Wentworth and named for Sir Samuel Cornish, a distinguished admiral of the Royal Navy. Since the 1827 partition of Cheshire County, the town has been within Sullivan County.

Since the late 19th century, Cornish has been a well-known summer resort for artists and writers. Sculptor Augustus Saint-Gaudens began coming to Cornish in 1885, seeking a studio away from the summer heat of New York City. Artist friends followed him, including painter and illustrator Maxfield Parrish, who designed and built his estate, the Oaks, in the area. The surrounding area became the center of the popular Cornish Art Colony. Cornish was the residence of the reclusive author J. D. Salinger from the 1950s until his death in 2010.

Until 2008, when the Smolen–Gulf Bridge opened in Ohio, Cornish had been home to the longest covered bridge (still standing) in the United States. Cornish remains home to the longest two-span covered bridge in the world. The Cornish–Windsor Covered Bridge spans the Connecticut River and was built in 1866 at an original cost of $9,000. Cornish also has three other covered bridges: the Blow-Me-Down Covered Bridge, Dingleton Hill Covered Bridge, and Kenyon Bridge.

Geography
The Connecticut River forms the western boundary of the town, which is also the New Hampshire–Vermont border. The town is drained by direct tributaries of the Connecticut: Blow-me-down Brook, Mill Brook, and Walker Brook; and by Redwater Brook, which flows south to the Sugar River in Claremont before that river joins the Connecticut. The eastern part of the town is a portion of the approximately  Blue Mountain Forest Association private game preserve, also known locally as Corbin Park, named after its founder, Austin Corbin.

Cornish is dotted with several small villages, including Cornish Center, Cornish Flat, Cornish City, Cornish Mills, South Cornish, Balloch, and Squag City.

Cornish is served by state routes 12A and 120, both of which connect Claremont to the south with Lebanon to the north.

Adjacent municipalities
 Plainfield, New Hampshire (north)
 Croydon, New Hampshire (east)
 Claremont, New Hampshire (south)
 Windsor, Vermont (west)

Demographics

As of the 2020 Census, the total population was 1,616, with a total of 761 housing units, 707 of which were occupied. The town's residents consisted of 1 American Indian or Alaska Native, 9 Asian, 7 Black or African American, 12 Some Other Race, 92 Two or More Races, and 1,495 White. 18 residents were Hispanic or Latino, and 1,494 Not Hispanic or Latino. As of the 2015-19 American Community Survey, 41.9% of the population had a bachelor's degree or higher. The median household income was $82,083, and the median age was 54.1, with 28.8% being age 65 or older. 8.6% were veterans. Home ownership rate was 92.6%.

As of the census of 2000, there were 1,661 people, 645 households, and 465 families residing in the town. The population density was 39.4 people per square mile (15.2/km2).  There were 697 housing units at an average density of 16.5 per square mile (6.4/km2).  The racial makeup of the town was 97.71% White, 0.30% African American, 0.30% Native American, 0.12% Asian, 0.12% Pacific Islander, 0.30% from other races, and 1.14% from two or more races. Hispanic or Latino of any race were 0.48% of the population.

There were 645 households, out of which 32.2% had children under the age of 18 living with them, 62.9% were married couples living together, 5.4% had a female householder with no husband present, and 27.8% were non-families. Of all households 21.2% were made up of individuals, and 7.4% had someone living alone who was 65 years of age or older.  The average household size was 2.57 and the average family size was 3.02.

In the town, the population was spread out, with 25.9% under the age of 18, 3.8% from 18 to 24, 26.4% from 25 to 44, 31.8% from 45 to 64, and 12.2% who were 65 years of age or older.  The median age was 42 years. For every 100 females, there were 100.1 males.  For every 100 females age 18 and over, there were 100.2 males.

The median income for a household in the town was $53,393, and the median income for a family was $60,313. Males had a median income of $36,115 versus $29,474 for females. The per capita income for the town was $23,165.  About 2.8% of families and 4.5% of the population were below the poverty line, including 5.8% of those under age 18 and 5.5% of those age 65 or over.

Sites of interest
 Balloch, New Hampshire
 Cornish Flat, New Hampshire
 Covered bridges:
 Blow-Me-Down Covered Bridge
 Cornish-Windsor Covered Bridge
 Dingleton Hill Covered Bridge
 Kenyon Bridge
 Saint-Gaudens National Historical Park
 New Hampshire Historical Marker No. 265: Cornish Meetinghouse

Notable people 

 Champion S. Chase (1820–1898), politician
 Dudley Chase (1771–1846), state's attorney of Orange County, Vermont, Speaker of the Vermont House of Representatives, Chief Justice of the Vermont Supreme Court, U.S. senator from Vermont
 Jonathan Chase (1732–1800), Revolutionary War officer
 Philander Chase (1775–1852), founder of Kenyon College, sixth Presiding Bishop of the U.S. Episcopal Church
 Salmon P. Chase (1808–1873), justice of the US Supreme Court; born in Cornish
 Winston Churchill (1871–1947), novelist; no relation to the British statesman of the same name
 Herbert Croly (1869–1930), author; co-founder of the magazine The New Republic
 Thomas Wilmer Dewing (1851–1938), painter; founding member of the Ten American Painters and taught at the Art Students League of New York
 Michael Dorris (1945–1997), novelist, scholar
 Julie Duncan (1919–1986), actress, champion steeplechase rider
 Louise Erdrich (born 1954), author
 Hamlin Garland (1860–1940), novelist, poet, essayist, short story writer, Georgist, psychical researcher; best known for his fiction involving hard-working Midwestern farmers
 Christian Gerhartsreiter (born 1961), impostor, convicted murderer
 James Hall (1802–1889), founder of Maryland-in-Africa
 Learned Hand (1872–1961), judge
 Percy MacKaye (1875–1956), playwright, poet
 Charles A. Platt (1861–1933), architect
 Samuel L. Powers (1848–1929), US congressman
 Augustus Saint-Gaudens (1848–1907), sculptor of the Beaux-Arts generation who embodied the ideals of the American Renaissance
 Louis St. Gaudens (1854–1913), significant American sculptor of the Beaux-Arts generation; brother of renowned sculptor Augustus Saint-Gaudens; Louis later changed the spelling of his name to St. Gaudens to differentiate himself from his well-known brother
 J. D. Salinger (1919–2010), writer, best known for his 1951 novel The Catcher in the Rye
 Nathan Smith (1762–1829), physician, founder of Dartmouth and Yale medical schools
 Nathan Ryno Smith (1797–1877), surgeon, professor, son of Nathan Smith
 Betsey Ann Stearns (1830-1914), inventor
 Woodrow Wilson (1856–1924), US president; summer resident at author Winston Churchill's Harlakenden House

References

External links 

 
 George H. Stowell Free Library
 Local Cornish info
 Cornish, New Hampshire at City-Data.com
 New Hampshire Economic and Labor Market Information Bureau Profile
 Cornish Fair
 Corbin Park
 Land Use in Cornish, N.H., a 2006 documentary presentation by James M. Patterson of the Valley News
 Cornish (N.H.: Town) Records, 1821–1873 at Dartmouth College Library

 
New Hampshire populated places on the Connecticut River
Towns in New Hampshire
Towns in Sullivan County, New Hampshire